Warren Public Library may refer to:

 Warren Public Library (Warren, Massachusetts), listed on the NRHP in Massachusetts
 Warren Public Library (Warren, Ohio), listed on the National Register of Historic Places in Trumbull County, Ohio